Charles de Sainte-Marthe (1512–1555) was a French Protestant and theologian.

External links
 

1512 births
1555 deaths
French Renaissance humanists
French Protestant theologians
16th-century Protestant theologians
16th-century French writers
16th-century male writers
16th-century French theologians
University of Poitiers alumni
French male non-fiction writers